Zekai Apaydın (1884 – 29 April 1947) was a former Turkish civil servant, diplomat and politician.

Early life
He was born in 1884 in Bosnia, then a nominal part of the Ottoman Empire under Austrian rule. He graduated from the İzmir highschool and the faculty of Political Sciences. He served in Uşak, Eskişehir, Mersin and Kayseri as the sanjak governor . Following the defeat of the Ottoman Empire in the First World War, he resigned and joined the nationalists.

Politics
He was elected to Turkish Parliament from Aydın Province and later from Diyarbakır Province.
In the 2nd government of Turkey he served as the Ministry of Agriculture between 6 March 1924 and 20 November 1924. In the 6th government of Turkey he served as the Ministry of Public Works between 27 September 1930 and 29 December 1930. But after a reshuffle in the government, he was appointed as the Ministry of National Defense on  29 December 1930. He kept the same seat in the next government up to 1 March 1935.

Diplomacy
After his term in the second government he was appointed as the ambassador to London in 1924 and to Moscow in 1925.

Death 
He died in Istanbul on 29 April 1947.

References

External links

1884 births
1947 deaths
Ministers of Agriculture and Forestry of Turkey
Republican People's Party (Turkey) politicians
Members of the 2nd government of Turkey
Members of the 6th government of Turkey
Members of the 7th government of Turkey
Members of the 2nd Parliament of Turkey
Members of the 3rd Parliament of Turkey
Members of the 4th government of Turkey
Ministers of National Defence of Turkey
Ministers of Public Works of Turkey
20th-century Turkish diplomats
Ambassadors of Turkey to the United Kingdom